Westervelt is a surname. Notable people with the surname include:

 Jacob Westervelt (1794–1881), Sheriff of New York County from 1831 to 1834
 Jacob Aaron Westervelt (1800-1879), shipbuilder in the mid-19th century, and a mayor of New York City between 1853 and 1855
 William Drake Westervelt (1849–1939), author of several books and magazines on Hawaiian history and legends
 Herbert Eugene Westervelt (1858-1938), founder of Gulf States Paper Company and inventor
 William Irving Westervelt (1876-1960), US Army general
 George Conrad Westervelt(1879-1956), co-founder of The Boeing Company
 Peter Westervelt (1919–2015), physicist, and nephew of George Conrad Westervelt
 Franklin H. Westervelt (1930-2015), engineer, computer scientist, and educator at the University of Michigan and Wayne State University
 Robert M. Westervelt, physicist and educator at Harvard University